Kozica  is a small village in the Split-Dalmatia County of Croatia.

History
Kozica was first mentioned in documents of the Kreševskoj era in 1434.

Prehistory 
Around Kozica there are more than sixteen archeological sites with ancient burials, dated since 1900 B.C. to the late medieval period. In the near area, there are gomile and stećci, evidence of the ancient cattle breeders and warriors.

Ottoman Empire
When Vrgorac capitulated to the Ottoman Empire, Kozica probably fell with the rest of the area. The spread of Islam into the region that came with the arrival of the Ottoman army concerned the occupants of the monastery in Makarska, who began to worry about the residents in Kozica and the surrounding region, fearing that many would convert to Islam.

Post-Ottoman occupation
After the liberation of inner Dalmatia from the Ottoman Empire, most of Kozica and the surrounding villages had been deserted because of the exodus of the populace to the northern regions of Croatia. The Venetian Republic repopulated the area with Herzegovinian people from the east.

The withdrawal of the Ottomans saw the region come under the jurisdiction of the Venetian Republic, then under the rule of Napoleon. A short and prosperous period followed, which included the construction of the "napoleonsku cestu" (Napoleon's road), encouraging travel to the area. With the failure of Napoleon's campaign in Dalmatia, Kozica fell under the rule of Austria-Hungary, and remained so until the end of the First World War.

Kingdom of Serbs, Croats and Slovenes (1918–1941) and World War II
Many of Kozica's population bought land near Vrgorac, where they grew their own produce, including olives and grapes; the area acquired a reputation for good wine. The Second World War changed this for the worse.

In World War II, all houses in the village were burnt down, and 20% of the villagers were killed by either Chetnik or Italian units, or in combat, fighting for the Partisans.

Climate

Kozica has a Sub-Mediterranean climate, but due to its elevation Kozica has its own microclimate which differs from the Dalmatian Coast. Kozica is situated on a plateau in between two mountains, Biokovo and Sveti Mihovil.

Tourism and the economy
Tourism has started in Kozica and it is becoming common for cyclists to tour the region and its rocky landscape. Kozica's natural environment is also an attraction in the summer. Kozica is a small Mediterranean mountain village which is 20 minutes by car from the nearest beach. Kozica is also home to various palm trees and many other types of flora. Tourism in Kozica is expected to increase with the construction of the A1 highway from Zagreb via Split to Dubrovnik.

Demographics

There was an increase in population from the 1800s until the Second World War. After 1945 the decrease in population was due to the exodus of people trying to find a better life in the cities or migrating. In recent decades, there was a dramatic drop from previous censuses. Many inhabitants have moved to the seaside, Makarska in particular.

Gallery

References

External links

Website of Kozica
Website For Vrgorac municipality

Populated places in Split-Dalmatia County